Mexico is scheduled to compete at the 2023 Pan American Games in Santiago, Chile from October 20 to November 5, 2023. This will be Mexico's 19th appearance at the Pan American Games, having competed at every Games since the inaugural edition in 1951.

Competitors
The following is the list of number of competitors (per gender) participating at the games per sport/discipline.

Archery 

Mexico qualified three athletes (one man and two women) by winning the respective categories in the 2021 Junior Pan American Games. Mexico also qualified eight athletes during the 2022 Pan American Archery Championship.

 Men

 Women

 Mixed

Athletics 

 Men
 Track & road events

Key: Q = Qualified for next round based on position in heat; q = Qualified for next round as fastest loser; * = Athlete ran in a preliminary round but not the final

 Field events

Key: Q = Qualify for final based on position in group; q = Qualify for final based on position in field without meeting qualifying mark

 Women
 Track & road events

Key: Q = Qualified for next round based on position in heat; q = Qualified for next round as fastest loser; * = Athlete ran in a preliminary round but not the final

Basketball

Mexico qualified a men's team (of 12 athletes) by finishing fifth in the 2022 FIBA Americup.

Men's tournament

Summary

Basque pelota 

Mexico qualified a team of 6 athletes (two men and four women) through the 2022 Basque Pelota World Championship in Biarritz, France.

 Men

 Women

Bowling 

Mexico qualified a team of two women through the 2022 PABCON Champion of Champions held in Rio de Janeiro, Brazil.

Canoeing

Sprint
Mexico qualified a total of 14 sprint athletes (seven men and seven women).

Men

Women

Cycling 

Mexico qualified one female athlete by winning the event in the 2021 Junior Pan American Games.

Road cycling

Diving 

Mexico qualified four athletes (two men and two women) by winning the respective events in the 2021 Junior Pan American Games. Mexico also qualified three other athletes (one man and two women) by finishing among the top 18 athletes of the respective events in the 2022 World Aquatics Championships.

 Men

 Women

Fencing

Mexico qualified a team of 16 fencers (seven men and nine women), after five of six teams (except the men's épée) finished at least in the top seven at the 2022 Pan American Fencing Championships in Ascuncion, Paraguay. Mexico also qualified one male individual in the épée event.

Individual
Men

Women

Team

Field hockey

Men's tournament

Mexico qualified a men's team (of 16 athletes) by finishing 5th at the 2022 Pan American Cup.

Summary

Football

Men's tournament

Mexico qualified a men's team of 18 athletes after finishing as the top ranked North American team at the 2022 CONCACAF U-20 Championship.

Summary

Gymnastics

Trampoline 
Mexico qualified one female athlete by winning the event in the 2021 Junior Pan American Games.

Modern pentathlon

Mexico qualified seven modern pentathletes (three men and four women).

Roller sports 

Speed

Rugby sevens

Men's tournament

Mexico qualified a men's team (of 12 athletes) by reaching the final of the 2022 RAN Super Sevens.

Summary

Women's tournament

Mexico qualified a women's team (of 12 athletes) by reaching the final of the 2022 RAN Women's Super Sevens

Summary

Sailing 

Mexico has qualified 5 boats for a total of 6 sailors.

Men

 Women

Squash 

Mexico qualified one male athlete by winning the singles event in the 2021 Junior Pan American Games.

 Men

Shooting

Mexico qualified a total of 19 shooters after the 2022 Americas Shooting Championships. Mexico also qualified one shooter by winning one event in the 2021 Junior Pan American Games.

Men
Pistol and rifle

Men
Shotgun

Women
Pistol and rifle

Women
Shotgun

Softball

Mexico qualified a women's team (of 18 athletes) by virtue of its campaign in the 2022 Pan American Championships.

Summary

Surfing

Mexico qualified one male surfer.

Artistic

Swimming 

Mexico qualified three athletes (one man and two women) by winning the respective events in the 2021 Junior Pan American Games.

 Men

 Women

Taekwondo

Mexico has qualified three athletes at Kyorugi events, by virtue of their titles in the 2021 Junior Pan American Games.

Kyorugi

Men

Women

Triathlon 

Mexican triathlete Anahí Álvarez achieved an individual spot after winning the individual competition in the 2021 Junior Pan American Games.

 Individual

Volleyball

Men's tournament

Mexico qualified a men's team (of 12 athletes) by winning the 2021 Men's Pan-American Volleyball Cup.

Summary

Women's tournament

Mexico qualified a women's team (of 12 athletes) after being the best team from NORCECA at the 2021 Junior Pan American Games.

Summary

Water skiing

Mexico qualified two wakeboarders (one of each gender) during the 2022 Pan American Championship.<

Mexico also qualified four water skiers during the 2022 Pan American Water skiing Championship.

Men

Women

Wakeboard
Men

Women

Weightlifting 

Mexico qualified a full team of eight weightlifters (four men and four women) after the 2021 and 2022 editions of the Pan American Weightlifting Championships. Mexico also qualified one extra weightlifter after winning one category at the 2021 Junior Pan American Games.

 Men

 Women

Wrestling 

Mexico qualified eight wrestlers (Men's Freestyle: 74 kg, 86 kg), (Greco-Roman: 60 kg, 77 kg and 87 kg), (Women's Freestyle: 53 kg, 57 kg and 62 kg) through the 2022 Pan American Wrestling Championships held in Acapulco, Mexico.

 Men

 Women

See also
Mexico at the 2024 Summer Olympics

References

Nations at the 2023 Pan American Games
2023
2023 in Mexican sports